Clare Mackintosh is a British author and former police officer. Her novels are published in more than 35 languages and have sold more than two million copies worldwide.

Novels 
Mackintosh's debut novel I Let You Go was a Richard & Judy Book Club pick. It won Theakston's Old Peculier Crime Novel of the Year Award in 2016, beating J K Rowling writing as Robert Galbraith.
In October 2016, the French translation of I Let You Go (Te Laisser Partir) won "best international novel" at the Cognac Festival Prix du Polar awards. In March 2017 publisher Little, Brown announced that I Let You Go has sold over one million copies worldwide.

Her second novel, I See You, was also a Richard & Judy Book Club pick, winning the readers' vote. It charted at number 1 in The Sunday Times original fiction list and was shortlisted for Crime & Thriller Book of the Year in the British Book Awards.

In March 2018 Mackintosh published her third novel, Let Me Lie, which charted at number 1 in The Sunday Times original fiction list. It was also chosen as a Richard & Judy Book Club pick.

Mackintosh's fourth novel, After the End, was published in hardback in June 2019 and became an instant Sunday Times bestseller.

Mackintosh was a judge of the First Novel category of the Costa Book Awards 2019.

In October 2020 it was announced that Mackintosh's fifth novel would be a thriller called Hostage. It was published in the summer of 2021.

Education and police career
Mackintosh went to Royal Holloway University in Surrey, taking a degree in French and Management, and spent a year in Paris as part of the course, working as a bilingual secretary.

Mackintosh joined the police force upon graduation. She was posted on promotion to Chipping Norton as town sergeant before becoming Thames Valley Police’s operations inspector for Oxfordshire. Mackintosh spent 12 years in the police force before leaving in 2011 to become a full-time writer.

Personal life

In 2006, Mackintosh delivered twin boys prematurely. Her son Alex contracted meningitis and suffered significant brain damage. Mackintosh and her husband made the decision to remove him from intensive care and allow him to die. When her surviving son was 15 months old, Mackintosh gave birth to a second set of twins.

Charity work

Mackintosh is a founder and former trustee of the Chipping Norton Literary Festival. She is patron of the Silver Star Society, a charity supporting the John Radcliffe Hospital's work with families facing difficult pregnancies.

In January 2019 Mackintosh donated her advance for her book A Cotswold Family Life to the Silver Star Society, who used the donation to buy foetal monitoring equipment for the maternity unit.

List of works
 I Let You Go (Sphere, 2014)
 I See You (Sphere, 2016)
 Let Me Lie (Sphere, 2018)
 A Cotswold Family Life (Sphere, 2019)
 After the End (Sphere, 2019)
 The Understudy (Hodder, 2019) (with Holly Brown, Sophie Hannah and B.A. Paris)
 The Donor (Sphere, 2020)
 Hostage (Sphere, 2021)
 The Last Party (Sphere, 2022)
 A Game of Lies (Sphere, 2023)

References

External links
 

Living people
British crime writers
21st-century British novelists
British women novelists
Women mystery writers
21st-century British women writers
Year of birth missing (living people)
Alumni of Royal Holloway, University of London